Innegra S is the brandname of Innegra Technologies LLC for a polyolefin (highly oriented; 90+% polypropylene).

History
Work on Innegra began in 2004.  A pilot production line was opened in Greer, SC in June 2006  

On July 11, 2006 the US Patent Office issued Innegrity LLC a patent entitled “Melt-spun polyolefin multifilament yarn formation processes and yarns formed therefrom"

Production
Innegra S is produced in several sizes noted by their denier.

Weaving
Innegra S yarn is woven by a number of third party weavers.  Innegra S can be woven alone, with carbon, fiberglass or other fibers to produce a hybrid fabric for the composites industry.

Applications

 Composites:
 sports & recreation - hockey sticks, tennis rackets, etc
 kayaks, stand up paddle boards, surf boards
 fiber reinforced concrete
 Automotive:
 Formula One
 Marine
 sail cloth 
 boat hull material
 kayak
 Protective Gear Ballistics: 
 protective clothing and helmets
 fabrics
 body armor
 helmet

See also

 Aramid
 Fibers
 Nylon
 Personal protective equipment
 Textile
 Ballistics

References

External links
 Innegrity website
 wikInnegra
 General Aramid information

Synthetic fibers
Brand name materials
Body armor
Protective gear